The Windtech Bantoo is a Spanish two-place paraglider that was designed and produced by Windtech Parapentes of Gijón. It is now out of production.

Design and development
The Bantoo was designed as a tandem glider for flight training.

The glider is DHV 1-2 certified.

The glider wing is made from Porcher Marine Skytex 45 g/m2 nylon fabric, with the v-ribs of lighter 34 g/m2 fabric. The rib reinforcements are 310 g/m2 Dacron, with the trailing edge reinforcement fabricated of 175 g/m2 polyester. The lines are all sheathed Kevlar, with the A and B lines 2.2 mm in diameter, the C and D lines 1.7 mm in diameter and the upper lines 1.1 mm in diameter. The risers are made from 25 mm wide polyester strapping.

Specifications (Bantoo)

References

External links

Bantoo
Paragliders